The 2016 Asian Rowing Championships were the 17th Asian Rowing Championships and took place from 9 to 13 September 2016, in Fenhu Water Sports Center, Jiashan, China.

Medal summary

Men

Women

Medal table

References

External links
Asian Rowing Fedeation

Rowing Championships
Asian
Asian Rowing Championships
International sports competitions hosted by China
September 2016 sports events in China